Sümenler is a village in the Pınarbaşı District, Kastamonu Province, Turkey. Its population is 225 (2021).

Geography 
It is 127 km from Kastamonu city and 31 km from Pınarbaşı town.

Economy 
The economy of the village is based on forest products, agriculture and animal husbandry.

References 

Villages in Pınarbaşı District, Kastamonu